Gautam Sanyal is an Indian career civil servant who currently serves as Principal Secretary to Government of West Bengal, since June 2015. In June 2016, he was re-appointed as Principal Secretary and his tenure co-terminus with that of Chief Minister of West Bengal.

He previously served as Secretary to Chief Minister of West Bengal from 2011 to 2015. He also previously served as Joint Secretary to Government of India. He is a 1978 batch Central Secretariat Service officer.

Early life and education
Sanyal has a Bachelor of Arts in political science, a Masters in Sociology and the later earned a Master of Business Administration from United Kingdom.

Career

Sanyal joined the Central Secretariat Service in 1976 after qualifying through the Civil Services Examination. He rose through ranks and was later empanelled as Joint Secretary to Government of India in Ministry of Food Processing Industries in June 2009 by the Appointments Committee of the Cabinet. He was also the board member of the Food Safety and Standards Authority of India.

He later served as Officer on Special Duty to Union Cabinet Minister of Railways from 2009 to 2011. He retired in 2011.

After retirement from the Central Government, he was appointed as Secretary to the Chief Minister of West Bengal. His appointment and tenure to the post was made co-terminous with that of the Chief Minister.

Recognition
He is the first non Indian Administrative Service officer in West Bengal and the first retired civil servant to hold the position of Secretary in the Chief Ministers Office. He also became the first non IAS officer in history to hold the position of Principal Secretary in State governments of India.

In 2011, a news blog declared him as the new poster boy of India's civil services. The Indian Express and The Financial Express rate him as top state bureaucrat in India in the article most powerful Indians for the year 2013. Many media articles consider him to the most powerful civil servant in the state in India and the "most important officer" in the Government of West Bengal.

In 2015, Ministry of Personnel, Public Grievances and Pensions (DOPT) of Government of India rejected petition filed by the IAS association against the appointment of Gautam Sanyal as the Principal Secretary. In 2018, India Today listed Sanyal in top 10 hidden corridor power in India.

Issues
In 2013, media articles reported that CBI director Ranjit Sinha had placed Sanyal on his hit-list. In 2019, media reported that Sanyal is in the process of investigation by Enforcement Directorate in connection with the disinvestment of a state government company in West Bengal.

References

External links

 Departmental Secretaries (Archived) Official Government of West Bengal (2018)
 Appointment to Government  (Archived) Official Government of West Bengal, Personnel and Administrative Reforms (2015)
 IAS Lobby Frets Over Eroding Monopoly The New Indian Express (2015)
 
 
 Mamata ropes in officials from Railway Ministry
 
 Civil Servants scramble to keep up with workaholic Chief Minister
 The list of Presentations of the Proceedings of Food Safety And Quality Year 2008–09

1951 births
Living people
Bengali people
People from West Bengal
Indian civil servants
Indian government officials
Central Secretariat Service officers